Delta Epsilon Sigma  is a national scholastic honor society that was established in 1939 for students of Catholic universities and colleges in the United States. The society was founded at Loras College in Dubuque, Iowa in 1939 by Father Fitzgerald. 

Delta Epsilon Sigma has 119 chapters across the United States and has more than 39,000 members as of 2021.

Membership 
Membership is by invitation sent from the college or university's chapter. Undergraduate students must be ranked in the top twenty percent of their class and have completed at least half of the credit requirements for their baccalaureate degree. Graduate students must also have a minimum GPA of 3.5 on a 4.0 scale and have completed at least half of the credits for their degree. Individual chapters can set more stringent GPA requirements. These excellent statistics alone do not assure membership; candidates must also have a record of dedication to intellectual activity and community service.

References

External links
  ACHS Delta Epsilon Sigma entry

Association of College Honor Societies
Student organizations established in 1939
1939 establishments in Iowa